Jillian D'Alessio (born April 5, 1985 in Middle Sackville, Nova Scotia) is a Canadian sprint kayaker. She was part of the Canadian women's K-4 500 m event who finished eighth at the 2004 Summer Olympics. Jillian also competed in the 2003 Pan American Games in the Dominican Republic where she won a gold medal in the K-4 500 m and a bronze medal in the K-1 500 m. Four years later in Rio de Janeiro, D'Alessio won a gold medal in the K-1 500 m and bronze in the K-4 500 m.

Coaching
D'Alessio coached at Banook Canoe Club in Dartmouth, Nova Scotia for Peewee Boys and Girls in the Summer of 2012.

References
Jillian D'Alessio on Real Champions
Sports-Reference.com profile

1985 births
Canadian female canoeists
Canadian people of Italian descent
Canoeists at the 2004 Summer Olympics
Canoeists at the 2007 Pan American Games
Living people
Olympic canoeists of Canada
People from the Halifax Regional Municipality
Sportspeople from Nova Scotia
Pan American Games gold medalists for Canada
Pan American Games bronze medalists for Canada
Pan American Games medalists in canoeing
Medalists at the 2007 Pan American Games